ABS-CBN Sports was a sports division of the Philippine media conglomerate ABS-CBN, which aired some of the notable sporting events in the Philippines.

ABS-CBN Sports began in 1998 as the main broadcaster for the network-backed basketball league Metropolitan Basketball Association which introduced the home-and-away play format in the Philippine basketball landscape. Simultaneous with that (shortly before the MBA collapsed), it acquired the broadcast rights to the University Athletic Association of the Philippines (UAAP) and National Collegiate Athletic Association (Philippines) (NCAA) collegiate basketball leagues, which bolstered Studio 23's ratings and at the same time aligned further toward the said channel's programming thrust to the youth.

ABS-CBN Sports also supplant contents to their sports channel S+A aired on UHF Channel 23 (main channel) and SkyCable Channel 166 (HD channel). The division also maintains their official website, sports.abs-cbn.com, one of the top sports news websites in the Philippines.

On July 15, 2020, ABS-CBN Corporation announced that its sports division will cease its operations on August 31, 2020, following the cease-and-desist order issued by the National Telecommunications Commission due to the expiration of ABS-CBN's legislative franchise to operate and its denial of a new franchise by the House of Representatives.

Following the closure, several sports rights were transferred to the different TV channels. Despite the closure, ABS-CBN Sports remain on digital platforms to deliver sports news updates.

Final programs

Exclusive contract
Note: Titles are listed in alphabetical order followed by the year it debuted in parentheses.

Local
 ALA Promotions Bouts (Pinoy Pride) (2009-2019)
 Beach Volleyball Republic (2016-2019)
 Maharlika Pilipinas Basketball League (2018-2020; now with IBC and later One PH)
 Palarong Pambansa (2016-2018)
 Philippines National Football Team Games (2010-2014)
 Philippines Women's National Football Team Games (2012-2014)

International
 Asian Football Confederation (official broadcaster for the Philippines) (2011-2014)
 ASEAN Football Federation (official broadcaster for the Philippines) (2011-2016)
 ASEAN Basketball League (2016-2020)
 Bellator MMA (2016-2019)
 FIFA (2009-2019) (official broadcaster for the Philippines)
 FIVB (official broadcaster for the Philippines) (2016-2018)
 La Liga (2017-2019)
 Ligue 1 (2018-2019)
 National Basketball Association (2000-2019 now with TV5 and One Sports)
 ONE Championship (2016-2020 now with One Sports)
 Premier League (2017)
 Brazilian League (Free TV Telecast Only) (2011-2015)
 UEFA (official broadcaster for the Philippines) (2016-2018)
 UEFA Champions League (2017-2018)
 US Open (2007-2016) (official broadcaster for the Philippines)

Previous programs
 The Score
 Sports U (under ABS-CBN News)
 Upfront

Past programs & notable coverage
 2001 SEABA Championship
 2009 FIFA Confederations Cup 
 2010 FIFA World Cup 
 2013 FIFA Confederations Cup
 2014 FIFA World Cup
 2014 FIBA Basketball World Cup
 Metropolitan Basketball Association Games (1998-2001)
 National Basketball Association (2011-2019; now with One Sports/Cignal TV)
 2010 AFF Suzuki Cup
 2014 AFF Suzuki Cup
 2011 Southeast Asian Games
 2013 Southeast Asian Games
 2019 Southeast Asian Games 
 Brazilian League (2012-2015 on cable)
 Filoil Flying V Preseason Premier Cup (2006-2017)
 The 1st PBA DLSU vs. PBA ADMU Game
 International Premier Tennis League (2014) (official broadcaster for the Philippine Mavericks)
 Philippine Basketball League Games (2003-2007)
 Philippine Collegiate Champions League (2009-2017)
 Premier Volleyball League (2017-2020; now with One Sports/Cignal TV)
 Morales-Pacquiao Bouts 
 National Collegiate Athletic Association (2002-2011, 2015–2020; now with GMA Network)
 Shakey's V- League (2016-2017)
 World Pool Championship 2007
 Sports Report 
 Sports TV 
 Game Na!
 Gameplan
 Road to Johannesburg
 Top Rank & Featured boxing matches
 Touchline
 University Athletic Association of the Philippines (2000-2020; now with One Sports/Cignal TV)
 Wild Card
 Universal Reality Combat Championship (2016-2018)
 UFC Fight Night (2011-2015)
 National Football League (1996-2000)

Sports broadcasters

Final on-air staff

Past on-air staff

See also
 ABS-CBN News and Current Affairs
 Liga
 S+A

References

External links
 

ABS-CBN Corporation
Sports divisions of TV channels
Assets owned by ABS-CBN Corporation